Johnsburg is an unincorporated community in Cass Township, Dubois County, in the U.S. state of Indiana.

History
Johnsburg was one of the first railroad stations in the county.

A post office was established at Johnsburg in 1879, and remained in operation until it was discontinued in 1930.

Geography

References

External links

Unincorporated communities in Dubois County, Indiana
Unincorporated communities in Indiana
Jasper, Indiana micropolitan area